Boomer is a fictional character in the sci-fi franchise Battlestar Galactica.

Boomer may also refer to:

 Lieutenant Boomer in Galactica 1980.
 Number Eight (Battlestar Galactica).

See also
Boomer (disambiguation)